The Athletics at the 2016 Summer Paralympics – Men's 100 metres T44 event at the 2016 Paralympic Games took place on 8–9 September 2016, at the Estádio Olímpico João Havelange.

Heats

Heat 1 
17:45 8 September 2016:

Heat 2 
17:52 8 September 2016:

Final 
19:58 9 September 2016:

Notes

Athletics at the 2016 Summer Paralympics
2016 in men's athletics